Tom Whittington (19 August 1848 – 7 October 1919) was a Scotland international  rugby union player who represented Scotland in 1873.

Although from Wales, Whittington was schooled in Edinburgh. He played cricket for Merchiston Castle School

Rugby Union career

Amateur career

After his Scottish schooling Whittington played as a forward for Merchistonians; which was the Former Pupils side of Merchiston Castle School.

Provincial career

The selection of players to the District sides were open to any nationality; albeit the sides were viewed as a stepping stone to the international team.

He represented Edinburgh District against Glasgow District in the world's first provincial match, the 'inter-city', on 23 November 1872.

International career

Whittington's time in Scotland being schooled; his remaining residence in Scotland to play for the Former Pupil side; and his performances in the Inter-City matches against Glasgow District; offered Whittington a gateway for selection for Scotland.

His international debut was the home match on 3 March 1873 at Glasgow. It was his only appearance for Scotland.

Family

His son Tom Whittington played cricket for Glamorgan.

References

1848 births
1919 deaths
Edinburgh District (rugby union) players
Royal HSFP players
Merchistonian FC players
Rugby union forwards
Rugby union players from Neath Port Talbot
Scotland international rugby union players
Scottish rugby union players